Saturation diving is diving for periods long enough to bring all tissues into equilibrium with the partial pressures of the inert components of the breathing gas used. It is a diving mode that reduces the number of decompressions divers working at great depths must undergo by only decompressing divers once at the end of the diving operation, which may last days to weeks, having them remain under pressure for the whole period. A diver breathing pressurized gas accumulates dissolved inert gas used in the breathing mixture to dilute the oxygen to a non-toxic level in the tissues, which can cause decompression sickness ("the bends") if permitted to come out of solution within the body tissues; hence, returning to the surface safely requires lengthy decompression so that the inert gases can be eliminated via the lungs. Once the dissolved gases in a diver's tissues reach the saturation point, however, decompression time does not increase with further exposure, as no more inert gas is accumulated.

Saturation diving takes advantage of this by having divers remain in that saturated state. When not in the water, the divers live in a sealed environment which maintains their pressurised state; this can be an ambient pressure underwater habitat or a saturation system at the surface, with transfer to and from the pressurised living quarters to the equivalent depth underwater via a closed, pressurised diving bell. This may be maintained for up to several weeks, and divers are decompressed to surface pressure only once, at the end of their tour of duty. By limiting the number of decompressions in this way, and using a conservative decompression schedule the risk of decompression sickness is significantly reduced, and the total time spent decompressing is minimised. Saturation divers typically breathe a helium–oxygen mixture to prevent nitrogen narcosis, and limit work of breathing, but at shallow depths saturation diving has been done on nitrox mixtures.

Most of the physiological and medical aspects of diving to the same depths are much the same in saturation and bell-bounce ambient pressure diving, or are less of a problem, but there are medical and psychological effects of living under saturation for extended periods.

Saturation diving is a specialized form of diving; of the 3,300 commercial divers employed in the United States in 2015, 336 were saturation divers. Special training and certification is required, as the activity is inherently hazardous, and a set of standard operating procedures, emergency procedures, and a range of specialised equipment is used to control the risk, that require consistently correct performance by all the members of an extended diving team. The combination of relatively large skilled personnel requirements, complex engineering, and bulky, heavy equipment required to support a saturation diving project make it an expensive diving mode, but it allows direct human intervention at places that would not otherwise be practicable, and where it is applied, it is generally more economically viable than other options, if such exist.

History

On December 22, 1938, Edgar End and Max Nohl made the first intentional saturation dive by spending 27 hours breathing air at 101 feet sea water (fsw) (30.8 msw) in the County Emergency Hospital recompression facility in Milwaukee, Wisconsin. Their decompression lasted five hours leaving Nohl with a mild case of decompression sickness that resolved with recompression.

Albert R. Behnke proposed the idea of exposing humans to increased ambient pressures long enough for the blood and tissues to become saturated with inert gases in 1942. In 1957, George F. Bond began the Genesis project at the Naval Submarine Medical Research Laboratory proving that humans could in fact withstand prolonged exposure to different breathing gases and increased environmental pressures. Once saturation is achieved, the amount of time needed for decompression depends on the depth and gases breathed. This was the beginning of saturation diving and the US Navy's Man-in-the-Sea Program.

Peter B. Bennett is credited with the invention of trimix breathing gas as a method to eliminate high pressure nervous syndrome. In 1981, at the Duke University Medical Center, Bennett conducted an experiment called Atlantis III, which involved subjecting volunteers to a pressure of 2250 fsw (equivalent to a depth of 686 m in seawater), and slowly decompressing them to atmospheric pressure over a period of 31-plus days, setting an early world record for depth-equivalent in the process. A later experiment, Atlantis IV, encountered problems as one of the volunteers experienced euphoric hallucinations and hypomania.

The history of commercial saturation diving is closely linked to offshore oil and gas extraction. In the early 1960s exploration of the North Sea started on the premise that the Dutch gas fields might extend under the sea. This was borne out when the Gulf Tide rig hit the Ekofisk reservoir in 1969 and in 1971 Shell oil found the Brent oilfield between Norway and the Shetlands. From this time to the 1990s the industry developed the procedures and equipment for saturation diving from pioneering and experimental, with a somewhat dubious safety record, to a mature industry with greatly improved occupational health and safety.

When the North Sea drilling started, there was little diving support infrastructure in Europe, and the high wages attracted divers from the Gulf of Mexico oilfields, who introduced the fibre reinforced resin lightweight demand helmets from Kirby-Morgan, hot water suits from Diving Unlimited International, and the U.S. Navy Diving Manual, at the time the leading set of offshore diving procedures. Research and development money was available, and new technical developments were supported by the European Economic Community. A major challenge was developing saturation diving practices suitable to the common North Sea depth range of 100 to 180 m.

During the early drilling stages most of the diving work was for relatively short periods and was generally suitable for bell-bounce diving, but the development of oilfield seabed infrastructure required much longer diver interventions, and saturation diving procedures were developed to suit. By 1982, a large amount of shallow maintenance work was becoming necessary, which brought in more air diving to service the rigs. By 2017 about 80% of North Sea diving was heliox saturation diving and the other 20% shallow air diving.

Excursion dives without decompression stops can be done both upward and downward from saturation storage pressure within limits, allowing the divers a range of working depths, and if work is required beyond excursion range, the divers can be compressed or decompressed in storage to suit the changed depth range. Further work was done by the United States Navy Experimental Diving Unit on excursion dives from February 1974 to June 1976, and the results published in the 1984 U.S. Navy Diving Manual. These tables used a partial pressure of oxygen of 0.35 to 0.4 bar during decompression, with quite slow decompression rates, which varied with the depth, getting slower as the depth decreased, with a 6-hour stop from midnight and a two-hour stop from 14:00 and a partial pressure limit of 22% for the last part of the ascent to reduce fire risk. The tables allowed decompression to start directly after return from a dive provided there had not been an upward excursion, as this was found to increase the risk of bubble development.

At the same time, the commercial diving contractor Compagnie maritime d'expertises (COMEX) had been developing slightly different decompression procedures, in which the oxygen partial pressures were higher, between 0.6 and 0.8 bar, and the ascent rates were faster to take advantage of the high PO2. Continuous decompression without night was used, and excursions were allowed.  Over time these were revised to use lower PO2 and slower ascent rates, particularly at the shallower depths. Competing tables were thought to be used to gain competitive advantage, so in 198 the Norwegian Petroleum Directorate organised a conference on saturation decompression safety under Dr Val Hempelman, and in 1990 a conference to harmonise the saturation tables to be used in the North Sea in the Norwegian sector using input from five contractors. In 199 the NORSOK U100 standard was published, which was a compromise using aspects of several of the tables, but which has proven in use to be sufficiently conservative and has a good safety record.

Saturation decompression in the Brazil oilfields took a slightly different route, and was originally based on company tables, until Brazil produced their own legislation in 1988, similar to that of the UK's Health and Safety Executive. In 2004 revised legislation was closer to the COMEX procedures.

By 2017 the system had settled into a chamber PO2 of 0.5 bar while deeper than 15 msw, and limited to 22 to 23% at the end of decompression to limit fire risk.

Applications

Saturation diving has applications in scientific diving and commercial offshore diving.

Commercial offshore diving, sometimes shortened to just offshore diving, is a branch of commercial diving, with divers working in support of the exploration and production sector of the oil and gas industry in places such as the Gulf of Mexico in the United States, the North Sea in the United Kingdom and Norway, and along the coast of Brazil. The work in this area of the industry includes maintenance of oil platforms and the building of underwater structures. In this context "" implies that the diving work is done outside of national boundaries.

Saturation diving is standard practice for bottom work at many of the deeper offshore sites, and allows more effective use of the diver's time while reducing the risk of decompression sickness. Surface oriented air diving is more usual in shallower water.

Underwater habitats are underwater structures in which people can live for extended periods and carry out most of the basic human functions of a 24-hour day, such as working, resting, eating, attending to personal hygiene, and sleeping. In this context 'habitat' is generally used in a narrow sense to mean the interior and immediate exterior of the structure and its fixtures, but not its surrounding marine environment. Most early underwater habitats lacked regenerative systems for air, water, food, electricity, and other resources. However, recently some new underwater habitats allow for these resources to be delivered using pipes, or generated within the habitat, rather than manually delivered.

An underwater habitat has to meet the needs of human physiology and provide suitable environmental conditions, and the one which is most critical is breathing air of suitable quality. Others concern the physical environment (pressure, temperature, light, humidity), the chemical environment (drinking water, food, waste products, toxins) and the biological environment (hazardous sea creatures, microorganisms, marine fungi). Much of the science covering underwater habitats and their technology designed to meet human requirements is shared with diving, diving bells, submersible vehicles and submarines, and spacecraft.

Numerous underwater habitats have been designed, built and used around the world since the early 1960s, either by private individuals or by government agencies. They have been used almost exclusively for research and exploration, but in recent years at least one underwater habitat has been provided for recreation and tourism. Research has been devoted particularly to the physiological processes and limits of breathing gases under pressure, for aquanaut and astronaut training, as well as for research on marine ecosystems. Access to and from the exterior is generally vertically through a hole in the bottom of the structure called a moon pool. The habitat may include a decompression chamber, or personnel transfer to the surface may be via a closed diving bell.

Employment
Saturation diving work in support of the offshore oil and gas industries is usually contract based.

Medical aspects

Decompression sickness

Decompression sickness (DCS) is a potentially fatal condition caused by bubbles of inert gas, which can occur in divers' bodies as a consequence of the pressure reduction as they ascend. To prevent decompression sickness, divers have to limit their rate of ascent, to reduce the concentration of dissolved gases in their body sufficiently to avoid bubble formation and growth. This protocol, known as decompression, can last for several hours for dives in excess of  when divers spend more than a few minutes at these depths. The longer divers remain at depth, the more inert gas is absorbed into their body tissues, and the time required for decompression increases rapidly. This presents a problem for operations that require divers to work for extended periods at depth, as the time spent decompressing can exceed the time spent doing useful work by a large margin. However, after somewhere around 72 hours under any given pressure, depending on the ingassing model used, divers' bodies become saturated with inert gas, and no further uptake occurs. From that point onward, no increase in decompression time is necessary. The practice of saturation diving takes advantage of this by providing a means for divers to remain at depth pressure for days or weeks. At the end of that period, divers need to carry out a single saturation decompression, which is much more efficient and a lower risk than making multiple short dives, each of which requires a lengthy decompression time. By making the single decompression slower and longer, in the controlled conditions and relative comfort of the saturation habitat or decompression chamber, the risk of decompression sickness during the single exposure is further reduced.

High pressure nervous syndrome

High pressure nervous syndrome (HPNS) is a neurological and physiological diving disorder that results when a diver descends below about  while breathing a helium–oxygen mixture. The effects depend on the rate of descent and the depth. HPNS is a limiting factor in future deep diving. HPNS can be reduced by using a small percentage of nitrogen in the gas mixture.

Compression arthralgia

Compression arthralgia is a deep aching pain in the joints caused by exposure to high ambient pressure at a relatively high rate of compression, experienced by underwater divers. The pain may occur in the knees, shoulders, fingers, back, hips, neck or ribs, and may be sudden and intense in onset and may be accompanied by a feeling of roughness in the joints. Onset commonly occurs around 60 msw (meters of sea water), and symptoms are variable depending on depth, compression rate and personal susceptibility. Intensity increases with depth and may be aggravated by exercise. Compression arthralgia is generally a problem of deep diving, particularly deep saturation diving, where at sufficient depth even slow compression may produce symptoms. The use of trimix can reduce the symptoms. Spontaneous improvement may occur over time at depth, but this is unpredictable, and pain may persist into decompression. Compression arthralgia may be easily distinguished from decompression sickness as it starts during descent, is present before starting decompression, and resolves with decreasing pressure, the opposite of decompression sickness. The pain may be sufficiently severe to limit the diver's capacity for work, and may also limit the depth of downward excursions.

Dysbaric osteonecrosis

Saturation diving (or more precisely, long term exposure to high pressure) is associated with aseptic bone necrosis, although it is not yet known if all divers are affected or only especially sensitive ones. The joints are most vulnerable to osteonecrosis. The connection between high-pressure exposure, decompression procedure and osteonecrosis is not fully understood.

Extreme depth effects
A breathing gas mixture of oxygen, helium and hydrogen was developed for use at extreme depths to reduce the effects of high pressure on the central nervous system. Between 1978 and 1984, a team of divers from Duke University in North Carolina conducted the Atlantis series of onshore-hyperbaric-chamber-deep-scientific-test-dives. In 1981, during an extreme depth test dive to 686 metres (2251 ft) they breathed the conventional mixture of oxygen and helium with difficulty and suffered trembling and memory lapses.

A hydrogen–helium–oxygen (hydreliox) gas mixture was used during a similar on shore scientific test dive by three divers involved in an experiment for the French Comex S.A. industrial deep-sea diving company in 1992. On 18 November 1992, Comex decided to stop the experiment at an equivalent of 675 meters of sea water (msw) (2215 fsw) because the divers were suffering from insomnia and fatigue. All three divers wanted to push on but the company decided to decompress the chamber to 650 msw (2133 fsw). On 20 November 1992, Comex diver Theo Mavrostomos was given the go-ahead to continue but spent only two hours at 701 msw (2300 fsw). Comex had planned for the divers to spend four and a half days at this depth and carry out tasks.

Oxygen toxicity

Both acute and chronic oxygen toxicity are significant risks in saturation diving. The storage breathing gas exposes the divers to one continuous level of oxygen concentration for extended periods, in the order of a month at a time, which requires the gas in the habitat to be maintained at a long term tolerable partial pressure, generally around 0.4 bar, which is well tolerated, and allows for quite large accidental deviations without causing hypoxia. This may be increased during decompression, but as decompression may take over a week, the safely tolerable increase is limited, and at lower pressures oxygen partial pressure is also limited by fire hazard considerations.

Bell and excursion gas composition must suit the planned dive profile. A higher oxygen partial pressure may be tolerable over the working period, but it may be logistically preferable to use the same gas used for storage. Bailout gas may have a higher oxygen content. At one time the recommended bailout oxygen partial pressure was significantly higher than used in the main gas supply.

Health effects of living under saturation conditions
There is some evidence of long term cumulative reduction in lung function in saturation divers.

Saturation divers are frequently troubled by superficial infections such as skin rashes, otitis externa and athlete's foot, which occur during and after saturation exposures. This is thought to be a consequence of raised partial pressure of oxygen, and relatively high temperatures and humidity in the accommodation.

Dysbaric osteonecrosis is considered a consequence of decompression injury rather than living under saturation conditions.

Operating procedures
Saturation diving allows professional divers to live and work at pressures greater than 50 msw (160 fsw) for days or weeks at a time, though lower pressures have been used for scientific work from underwater habitats. This type of diving allows for greater economy of work and enhanced safety for the divers. After working in the water, they rest and live in a dry pressurized habitat on, or connected to, a diving support vessel, oil platform or other floating work station, at approximately the same pressure as the work depth. The diving team is compressed to the working pressure only once, at the beginning of the work period, and decompressed to surface pressure once, after the entire work period of days or weeks. Excursions to greater depths require decompression when returning to storage depth, and excursions to shallower depths are also limited by decompression obligations to avoid decompression sickness during the excursion.

Increased use of underwater remotely operated vehicles (ROVs) and autonomous underwater vehicles (AUVs) for routine or planned tasks means that saturation dives are becoming less common, though complicated underwater tasks requiring complex manual actions remain the preserve of the deep-sea saturation diver.

A person who operates a saturation diving system is called a Life Support Technician (LST).

Personnel requirements
A saturation diving team requires at the minimum the following personnel:
 A diving supervisor (on duty during any diving operations)
 Two life-support supervisors (working shifts while there are divers under pressure)
 Two life-support technicians (also working shifts)
 Two divers in the bell (working diver and bellman – they may alternate during the dive)
 One surface stand-by diver (on duty when the bell is in the water)
 One tender for the surface stand-by diver 
In some jurisdictions there will also be a diving medical practitioner on standby, but not necessarily on site, and some companies may require a diving medical technician on site. The actual personnel actively engaged in aspects of the operation are usually more than the minimum.

Compression
Compression to storage depth is generally at a limited rate to minimize the risk of HPNS and compression arthralgia. Norwegian standards specifies a maximum compression rate of 1 msw per minute, and a rest period at storage depth after compression and before diving.

Storage depth
Storage depth, also known as living depth, is the pressure in the accommodation sections of the saturation habitat—the ambient pressure under which the saturation divers live when not engaged in lock-out activity. Any change in storage depth involves a compression or a decompression, both of which are stressful to the occupants, and therefore dive planning should minimize the need for changes of living depth and excursion exposures, and storage depth should be as close as practicable to the working depth, taking into account all relevant safety considerations.

Atmosphere control
The hyperbaric atmosphere in the accommodation chambers and the bell are controlled to ensure that the risk of long term adverse effects on the divers is acceptably low. Most saturation diving is done on heliox mixtures, with partial pressure of oxygen in accommodation areas kept around 0.40 to 0.48 bar, which is near the upper limit for long term exposure. Carbon dioxide is removed from the chamber gas by recycling it through scrubber cartridges. The levels are generally limited to a maximum of 0.005 bar partial pressure, equivalent to 0.5% surface equivalent. Most of the balance is helium, with a small amount of nitrogen and trace residuals from the air in the system before compression.

Bell operations and lockouts may also be done at between 0.4 and 0.6 bar oxygen partial pressure, but often use a higher partial pressure of oxygen, between 0.6 and 0.9 bar, which lessens the effect of pressure variation due to excursions away from holding pressure, thereby reducing the amount and probability of bubble formation due to these pressure changes. In emergencies a partial pressure of 0.6 bar of oxygen can be tolerated for over 24 hours, but this is avoided where possible. Carbon dioxide can also be tolerated at higher levels for limited periods. US Navy limit is 0.02 bar for up to 4 hours. Nitrogen partial pressure starts at 0.79 bar from the initial air content before compression, but tends to decrease over time as the system loses gas to lock operation, and is topped up with helium.

Deployment of divers 
 

Deployment of divers from a surface saturation complex requires the diver to be transferred under pressure from the accommodation area to the underwater workplace. This is generally done by using a closed diving bell, also known as a Personnel Transfer Capsule, which is clamped to the lock flange of the accommodation transfer chamber and the pressure equalized with the accommodation transfer chamber for transfer to the bell. The lock doors can then be opened for the divers to enter the bell. The divers will suit up before entering the bell and complete the pre-dive checks. The pressure in the bell will be adjusted to suit the depth at which the divers will lock out while the bell is being lowered, so that the pressure change can be slow without unduly delaying operations.

The bell is deployed over the side of the vessel or platform using a gantry or A-frame or through a moon pool. Deployment usually starts by lowering the clump weight, which is a large ballast weight suspended from a cable which runs down one side from the gantry, through a set of sheaves on the weight, and up the other side back to the gantry, where it is fastened. The weight hangs freely between the two parts of the cable, and due to its weight, hangs horizontally and keeps the cable under tension. The bell hangs between the parts of the cable, and has a fairlead on each side which slides along the cable as it is lowered or lifted. The bell hangs from a cable attached to the top. As the bell is lowered, the fairleads guide it down the clump weight cables to the workplace.

The bell umbilical is separate from the divers' umbilicals, which are connected on the inside of the bell. The bell umbilical is deployed from a large drum or umbilical basket and care is taken to keep the tension in the umbilical low but sufficient to remain near vertical in use and to roll up neatly during recovery.

A device called a bell cursor may be used to guide and control the motion of the bell through the air and the splash zone near the surface, where waves can move the bell significantly.

Once the bell is at the correct depth, the final adjustments to pressure are made and after final checks, the supervisor instructs the divers to lock out of the bell. The hatch is at the bottom of the bell and can only be opened if the pressure inside is balanced with the ambient water pressure. The bellman tends the working diver's umbilical through the hatch during the dive. If the diver experiences a problem and needs assistance, the bellman will exit the bell and follow the diver's umbilical to the diver and render whatever help is necessary and possible. Each diver carries back-mounted bailout gas, which should be sufficient to allow a safe return to the bell in the event of an umbilical gas supply failure.

Breathing gas is supplied to the divers from the surface through the bell umbilical. If this system fails, the bell carries an on-board gas supply which is plumbed into the bell gas panel and can be switched by operating the relevant valves. On-board gas is generally carried externally in several storage cylinders of 50 litres capacity or larger, connected through pressure regulators to the gas panel.

Helium is a very effective heat transfer material, and divers may lose heat rapidly if the surrounding water is cold. To prevent hypothermia, hot-water suits are commonly used for saturation diving, and the breathing gas supply may be heated. Heated water is produced at the surface and piped to the bell through a hot-water line in the bell umbilical, then is transferred to the divers through their excursion umbilicals.
The umbilicals also have cables for electrical power to the bell and helmet lights, and for voice communications and closed circuit video cameras. In some cases the breathing gas is recovered to save the expensive helium. This is done through a reclaim hose in the umbilicals, which ducts exhaled gas exhausted through a reclaim valve on the helmet, through the umbilicals and back to the surface, where the carbon dioxide is scrubbed and the gas boosted into storage cylinders for later use.

Excursions from storage depth
It is quite common for saturation divers to need to work over a range of depths while the saturation system can only maintain one or two storage depths at any given time. A change of depth from storage depth is known as an excursion, and divers can make excursions within limits without incurring a decompression obligation, just as there are no-decompression limits for surface oriented diving. Excursions may be upward or downward from the storage depth, and the allowed depth change may be the same in both directions, or sometimes slightly less upward than downward. Excursion limits are generally based on a 6 to 8 hour time limit, as this is the standard time limit for a diving shift.
These excursion limits imply a significant change in gas load in all tissues for a depth change of around 15m for 6 to 8 hours, and experimental work has shown that both venous blood and brain tissue are likely to develop small asymptomatic bubbles after a full shift at both the upward and downward excursion limits. These bubbles remain small due to the relatively small pressure ratio between storage and excursion pressure, and are generally resolved by the time the diver is back on shift, and residual bubbles do not accumulate over sequential shifts. However, any residual bubbles pose a risk of growth if decompression is started before they are eliminated. Ascent rate during excursions is limited, to minimize the risk and amount of bubble formation.

Decompression from saturation

Once all the tissue compartments have reached saturation for a given pressure and breathing mixture, continued exposure will not increase the gas loading of the tissues. From this point onward the required decompression remains the same. If divers work and live at pressure for a long period, and are decompressed only at the end of the period, the risks associated with decompression are limited to this single exposure. This principle has led to the practice of saturation diving, and as there is only one decompression, and it is done in the relative safety and comfort of a saturation habitat, the decompression is done on a very conservative profile, minimising the risk of bubble formation, growth and the consequent injury to tissues. A consequence of these procedures is that saturation divers are more likely to suffer decompression sickness symptoms in the slowest tissues, whereas bounce divers are more likely to develop bubbles in faster tissues.

Decompression from a saturation dive is a slow process. The rate of decompression typically ranges between 3 and 6 fsw (0.9 and 1.8 msw) per hour. The US Navy Heliox saturation decompression rates require a partial pressure of oxygen to be maintained at between 0.44 and 0.48 atm when possible, but not to exceed 23% by volume, to restrict the risk of fire.

For practicality the decompression is done in increments of 1 fsw at a rate not exceeding 1 fsw per hour, followed by a stop, with the average complying with the table ascent rate. Decompression is done for 16 hours in 24, with the remaining 8 hours split into two rest periods. A further adaptation generally made to the schedule is to stop at 4 fsw for the time that it would theoretically take to complete the decompression at the specified rate, i.e. 80 minutes, and then complete the decompression to surface at 1 fsw per hour. This is done to avoid the possibility of losing the door seal at a low pressure differential and losing the last hour or so of slow decompression.

Decompression following a recent excursion
Neither the excursions nor the decompression procedures currently in use have been found to cause decompression problems in isolation. However, there appears to be significantly higher risk when excursions are followed by decompression before non-symptomatic bubbles resulting from excursions have totally resolved. Starting decompression while bubbles are present appears to be the significant factor in many cases of otherwise unexpected decompression sickness during routine saturation decompression. The Norwegian standards do not allow decompression following directly on an excursion.

Architecture of a surface saturation facility

The "saturation system", "saturation complex" or "saturation spread" typically comprises either an underwater habitat or a surface complex made up of a living chamber, transfer chamber and submersible decompression chamber, which is commonly referred to in commercial diving and military diving as the diving bell, PTC (personnel transfer capsule) or SDC (submersible decompression chamber). The system can be permanently placed on a ship or ocean platform, but is more commonly capable of being moved from one vessel to another by crane. To facilitate transportation of the components, it is standard practice to construct the components as units based on the intermodal container system, some of which may be stackable to save deck space. The entire system is managed from a control room ("van"), where depth, chamber atmosphere and other system parameters are monitored and controlled. The diving bell is the elevator or lift that transfers divers from the system to the work site. Typically, it is mated to the system utilizing a removable clamp and is separated from the system tankage bulkhead by a trunking space, a kind of tunnel, through which the divers transfer to and from the bell. Thus the process involves only one ascent, thereby mitigating the time-consuming and comparatively risky process of in-water, staged decompression or sur-D O2 operations normally associated with non-saturation mixed gas diving. More than one living chamber can be linked to the transfer chamber through trunking so that diving teams can be stored at different depths where this is a logistical requirement. An extra chamber can be fitted to transfer personnel into and out of the system while under pressure and to treat divers for decompression sickness if this should be necessary.

The divers use surface supplied umbilical diving equipment, utilizing deep diving breathing gas, such as helium and oxygen mixtures, stored in large capacity, high pressure cylinders. The gas supplies are plumbed to the control room, where they are routed to supply the system components. The bell is fed via a large, multi-part umbilical that supplies breathing gas, electricity, communications and hot water. The bell also is fitted with exterior mounted breathing gas cylinders for emergency use.

While in the water the divers will often use a hot water suit to protect against the cold. The hot water comes from boilers on the surface and is pumped down to the diver via the bell's umbilical and then through the diver's umbilical.

Personnel transfer capsule
A closed diving bell, also known as personnel transfer capsule or submersible decompression chamber, is used to transport divers between the workplace and the accommodations chambers. The bell is a cylindrical or spherical pressure vessel with a hatch at the bottom, and may mate with the surface transfer chamber at the bottom hatch or at a side door. Each diver is supplied by an umbilical from inside the bell. The bell has a set of high pressure gas storage cylinders mounted on the outside containing on-board reserve breathing gas. The on-board gas and main gas supply are distributed from the bell gas panel, which is controlled by the bellman. The bell may have viewports and external lights. The divers' umbilicals are stored on racks inside the bell during transfer, and are tended by the bellman during the dive.

Bell handling system

The bell is deployed from a gantry or A-frame, also known as a bell launch and recovery system (LARS), on the vessel or platform, using a winch. Deployment may be over the side or through a moon pool.
The handling system must be able to support the dynamic loads imposed by operating in a range of weather conditions. 
It must be able to move the bell through the air/water interface (splash zone) in a controlled way, fast enough to avoid excessive movement caused by wave action.
A bell cursor may be used to limit lateral motion through and above the splash zone. 
It must keep the bell clear of the vessel or platform to prevent impact damage or injury. 
It must have sufficient power for fast retrieval of the bell in an emergency, and fine control to facilitate mating of the bell and transfer flange, and to accurately place the bell at the bottom. 
It must include a system to move the bell between the mating flange of the transfer chamber and the launch/retrieval position.

Transfer chamber
The transfer chamber is where the bell is mated to the surface saturation system for transfer under pressure (TUP). It is a wet surface chamber where divers prepare for a dive and strip off and clean their gear after return. Connection to the bell may be overhead, through the bottom hatch of the bell, or lateral, through a side door.

Accommodation chambers

The accommodation chambers may be as small as 100 square feet. This part is generally made of multiple compartments, including living, sanitation, and rest facilities, each a separate unit, joined by short lengths of cylindrical trunking. It is usually possible to isolate each compartment from the others using internal pressure doors. Catering and laundry are provided from outside the system and locked on and out as required.

Recompression chamber
A recompression chamber may be included in the system so that divers can be given treatment for decompression sickness without inconveniencing the rest of the occupants. The recompression chamber may also be used as an entry lock, and to decompress occupants who may need to leave before scheduled.

Mating flange for transportable chamber
One or more of the external doors may be provided with a mating flange or collar to suit a portable or transportable chamber, which can be used to evacuate a diver under pressure. The closed bell can be used for this purpose, but lighter and more easily portable chambers are also available. There will usually also be a mating flange for the hyperbaric rescue and escape system.

Supply lock
A small lock is used for transfer of supplies into and out of the pressurized system. This would normally include food, medical supplies, clothing, bedding etc.

Trunking
The pressurised compartments of the system are connected through access trunking: relatively short and small diameter  bolted between the external flanges of the larger compartments, with pressure seals, forming passageways between the chambers, which can be isolated by pressure doors.

Auxiliary and support equipment

Life support systems
The life support system provides breathing gas and other services to support life for the personnel under pressure. It includes the following components:
Breathing gas supply, distribution and recycling equipment: scrubbers, filters, boosters, compressors, mixing, monitoring, and storage facilities
Chamber climate control system – control of temperature and humidity, and filtration of gas
Instrumentation, control, monitoring and communications equipment
Fire suppression systems
Sanitation systems

The life support system for the bell provides and monitors the main supply of breathing gas, and the control station monitors the deployment and communications with the divers. Primary gas supply, power and communications to the bell are through a bell umbilical, made up from a number of hoses and electrical cables twisted together and deployed as a unit. This is extended to the divers through the diver umbilicals.

The accommodation life support system maintains the chamber environment within the acceptable range for health and comfort of the occupants. Temperature, humidity, breathing gas quality sanitation systems and equipment function are monitored and controlled.

Hot water system

Divers working in cold water, particularly when breathing helium-based gases (which increase the rate of heat transfer), may rapidly lose body heat and suffer from hypothermia. Hypothermia is unhealthy, can be life-threatening, and reduces diver effectiveness. This can be ameliorated with a hot water system. A diver hot water system heats filtered seawater and pumps it to the divers through the bell and diver umbilicals. This water can be used to heat the breathing gas before it is inhaled. The divers breathing gas is mainly heated on dives below 150 metres, and the region will dictate what temperature the water is heated to so that it will then flow through the diver's hot water suit to keep the diver warm.

Communication systems

Helium and high pressure both cause hyperbaric distortion of speech. The process of talking underwater is influenced by the internal geometry of the life support equipment and constraints on the communications systems as well as the physical and physiological influences of the environment on the processes of speaking and vocal sound production. The use of breathing gases under pressure or containing helium causes problems in intelligibility of diver speech due to distortion caused by the different speed of sound in the gas and the different density of the gas compared to air at surface pressure. These parameters induce changes in the vocal tract formants, which affect the timbre, and a slight change of pitch. Several studies indicate that the loss in intelligibility is mainly due to the change in the formants.

The difference in density of the breathing gas causes a non-linear shift of low-pitch vocal resonance, due to resonance shifts in the vocal cavities, giving a nasal effect, and a linear shift of vocal resonances which is a function of the velocity of sound in the gas, known as the Donald Duck effect. Another effect of higher density is the relative increase in intensity of voiced sounds relative to unvoiced sounds. The contrast between closed and open voiced sounds and the contrast between voiced consonants and adjacent vowels decrease with increased pressure. Change of the speed of sound is relatively large in relation to depth increase at shallower depths, but this effect reduces as the pressure increases, and at greater depths a change in depth makes a smaller difference. Helium speech unscramblers are a partial technical solution. They improve intelligibility of transmitted speech to surface personnel.

The communications system may have four component systems.
The hardwired intercom system, an amplified voice system with speech unscrambler to reduce the pitch of the speech of the occupants of the pressurized system. This system will provide communications between the main control console and the bell and accommodation chambers. This two-way system is the primary communications mode.
Wireless through-water communications between bell and main control console is a backup system in case of failure of the hardwired system with the bell.
Closed circuit video from cameras on the bell and diver helmets allow visual monitoring of the dive and the divers by the supervisor.
A sound powered phone system may be provided as a backup voice communication system between bell and control console

Bulk gas supplies

Gas storage and blending equipment are provided to pressurize and flush the system, and treatment gases should be available appropriate to the planned storage depths. Bulk stock of premixed gas is usually provided to suit the planned depth of the operation, and separate bulk stock of helium and oxygen to make up additional requirements, adjust chamber gas composition as the oxygen is used up, and mix decompression gas.

Bulk gas is usually stored in manifolded groups of storage cylinders known as "quads", which usually carry about 16 high pressure cylinders, each of about 50 litres internal volume mounted on a frame for ease of transport, or larger frames carrying larger capacity high pressure "tubes". These tube frames are usually designed to be handled by intermodal container handling equipment, so are usually made in one of the standard sizes for intermodal containers.

Gas reclaim systems

A helium reclaim system (or push-pull system) may be used to recover helium based breathing gas after use by the divers as this is more economical than losing it to the environment in open circuit systems. The recovered gas is passed through a scrubber system to remove carbon dioxide, filtered to remove odours and other impurities, and pressurised into storage containers, where it may be mixed with oxygen to the required composition. Alternatively the recycled gas can be more directly recirculated to the divers.

During extended diving operation very large amounts of breathing gas are used. Helium is an expensive gas and can be difficult to source and supply to offshore vessels in some parts of the world. A closed circuit gas reclaim system can save around 80% of gas costs by recovering about 90% of the helium based breathing mixture. Reclaim also reduces the amount of gas storage required on board, which can be important where storage capacity is limited. Reclaim systems are also used to recover gas discharged from the saturation system during decompression.

A reclaim system will typically consist of the following components:

Topside components:
A reclaim control console, which controls and monitors the booster pump, oxygen addition, diver supply pressure, exhaust hose pressure and make-up gas addition.
A gas reprocessing unit, with low-pressure carbon dioxide scrubber towers, filters' receivers and back-pressure regulator which will remove carbon dioxide and excess moisture in a condensation water trap. Other gases and odours can be removed by activated carbon filters.
A gas booster, to boost the pressure of the reclaimed gas to the storage pressure.
A gas volume tank
A storage system of pressure vessels to hold the boosted and reconstituted gas mixture until it is used. This functions as a buffer to allow for the variations of gas volume in the rest of the system due to pressure changes.
Dive control panel
A bell gas supply panel, to control the supply of gas to the bell.
Underwater components:
The bell umbilical, with the supply and exhaust hoses between the topside system and the bell.
Internal bell gas panel to supply the gas to the divers, and bell reclaim equipment, which controls the exhaust hose back-pressure, and can shut off the reclaim hose if the diver's gas supply is interrupted. A scrubber for the bell atmosphere and water trap would be included.
Diver excursion umbilicals, with supply and exhaust hoses between the bell and the divers
Reclaim helmets which supply gas to the divers on demand, with reclaim back-pressure regulators which exhaust the exhaled gas to the return line.
Bell back-pressure regulator with water trap

In operation the gas supply from the reclaim system is connected to the topside gas panel, with a backup supply at a slightly lower pressure from mixed gas storage which will automatically cut in if the reclaim supply pressure drops. The bellman will set onboard gas supply to a slightly lower pressure than surface supply pressure to the bell gas panel, so that it will automatically cut in if surface supply is lost. After locking out of the bell the diver will close the diverter valve and open the return valve on the helmet, to start the gas reclaim process. Once this is running, the reclaim control panel will be adjusted to make up the metabolic oxygen usage of the diver into the returned gas. This system will automatically shut down oxygen addition if the flow of exhaled gas from the diver fails, to avoid an excessive oxygen fraction in the recycled gas. There is an indicator light to show whether the return gas is flowing.

The gas supplied to the diver's helmet passes through the same hoses and demand valve as for the open circuit system, but the exhaled gas passes out into the reclaim valve at slightly above ambient pressure, which is considerably above atmospheric pressure, so the flow must be controlled to prevent dropping the helmet internal pressure and causing the demand valve to free-flow. This is achieved by using back-pressure regulators to control the pressure drop in stages. The reclaim valve itself is a demand triggered back-pressure regulator, and there is another back pressure regulator at the bell gas panel, and one at the surface before the receiver tanks. Each of these back-pressure regulators is set to allow about a 1 bar pressure drop.

Exhaust gas returns to the bell through the diver's umbilical exhaust hose, where it passes through a water separator and trap then through a back-pressure regulator which controls the pressure in the exhaust hose and which can be monitored on a pressure gauge in the bell and adjusted by the bellman to suit the excursion depth of the diver. The gas then passes through the bell umbilical exhaust hose to the surface via a non-return valve and another water trap. When the gas enters the surface unit it goes through a coalescing water separator and micron particle filter, and a float valve, which protects the reclaim system from large volumes of water in the event of a leak at depth. Another back-pressure regulator at the surface controls the pressure in the bell umbilical. The gas then passes into the receiver tanks, where oxygen is added at a flow rate calculated to compensate for metabolic use by the diver.

Before entering the boosters, the gas passes through a 0.1 micron filter. The gas is then boosted to storage pressure. Redundant boosters are provided to keep the system running while a booster is serviced. The boosters are automatically controlled to match the diver's gas consumption, and the boosted gas passes through a scrubber where the carbon dioxide is removed by a material like sodalime. Like the boosters, there are at least two scrubbers in parallel, so that they can be isolated, vented and repacked alternately while the system remains in operation. The gas then passes through a cooling heat exchanger to condense out any remaining moisture, which is removed by another 1 micon coalescing filter before it reaches the volume storage tank, where it remains until returned to the gas panel to be used by the divers. While in the volume tank, the gas can be analysed to ensure that it is suitable for re-use, and that the oxygen fraction is correct and carbon dioxide has been removed to specification before it is delivered to the divers. If necessary any lost gas can be compensated by topping up the volume tank from the high pressure storage. Gas from the volume tank is fed to the topside gas panel to be routed back to the bell and diver.

Sanitation system
The sanitation system includes hot and cold water supply for washbasins and showers, drainage, and marine toilets with holding tank and discharge system.

Control consoles 
It is common for the control room to be installed in an ISO intermode container for convenience of transport. There are three main control panels, for life support, dive control and gas management.

Gas management panel 
The gas management panel includes pressure regulation of gases from high pressure storage, and distribution to the consumers. Gases will include air, oxygen and heliox mixes

Saturation control panel 
The chamber control panel will typically include depth gauges for each compartment, including trunking, blowdown and exhaust valves, oxygen monitoring and other gas analysis equipment, make-up system for oxygen replenishment, valves for supplying therapeutic breathing mixture, closed circuit television monitoring displays, and monitoring systems with alarms for temperature and pressure in the system chambers.

Dive control panel 
The dive control panel will include depth gauges for bell internal and external pressure, diver and bellman depth, and trunking pressure for transfer to the accommodation chambers. There will also be breathing gas pressure gauges and control valves for each diver, and blowdown and exhaust valves for the bell interior, diver communications systems with speech unscramblers, a through-water emergency communications system to the bell, controls, monitors and recording equipment for helmet and bell mounted video cameras, oxygen analysers for diver breathing gas, oxygen and carbon dioxide analysers for bell and reclaim gas, alarms for reclaim gas flow, dynamic positioning and hot water supply.

Fire suppression system
Firefighting systems include hand held fire extinguishers to automatic deluge systems. Special fire extinguishers which do not use toxic materials must be used. In the event of a fire, toxic gases may be released by burning materials, and the occupants will have to use the built-in breathing systems (BIBS) until the chamber gas has been flushed sufficiently. When a system with oxygen partial pressure 0.48 bar is pressurized below about 70 msw (231fsw), the oxygen fraction is too low to support combustion (less than 6%), and the fire risk is low. During the early stages of compression and towards the end of decompression the oxygen levels will support combustion, and greater care must be taken.

Built in breathing systems

Built in breathing systems are installed for emergency use and for treatment of decompression sickness. They supply breathing gas appropriate to the current function, which is supplied from outside the pressurized system and also vented to the exterior, so the exhaled gases do not contaminate the chamber atmosphere.

Hyperbaric rescue and escape systems

A saturated diver who needs to be evacuated should preferably be transported without a significant change in ambient pressure. Hyperbaric evacuation requires pressurised transportation equipment, and could be required in a range of situations:
The support vessel at risk of capsize or sinking.
Unacceptable fire or explosion hazard.
Failure of the hyperbaric life support system.
A medical problem which cannot be dealt with on site.
A "lost" bell (a bell which has been broken free of lifting cables and umbilical; the actual position of the bell is usually still known with considerable accuracy).

A hyperbaric lifeboat or rescue chamber may be provided for emergency evacuation of saturation divers from a saturation system. This would be used if the platform is at immediate risk due to fire or sinking, and allows the divers under saturation to get clear of the immediate danger. A hyperbaric lifeboat is self-contained and can be operated by a surface pressure crew while the chamber occupants are under pressure. It must be self-sufficient for several days at sea, in case of a delay in rescue due to sea conditions. It is possible to start decompression after launching if the occupants are medically stable, but seasickness and dehydration may delay the decompression until the module has been recovered.

The rescue chamber or hyperbaric lifeboat will generally be recovered for completion of decompression due to the limited onboard life support and facilities. The recovery plan will include a standby vessel to perform the recovery.

IMCA recognises that though the number of hyperbaric evacuations which have been successfully carried out is small, and the likelihood of an incident needing hyperbaric evacuation is extremely low, the risk is sufficient to justify requiring the equipment to be available. The original meaning for the term hyperbaric evacuation system covered the system that actually transported the divers away from the working hyperbaric system such as a hyperbaric rescue chamber, a self-propelled hyperbaric lifeboat, or hyperbaric rescue vessel, all of which float and carry short term life-support systems of varied endurance, but it has more recently come to include all of the equipment that would support a hyperbaric evacuation, such as a life support package that can be connected to a recovered hyperbaric rescue unit, to provide interim life support until decompression facilities are available, and the hyperbaric reception facility where divers can be decompressed and treated in relative comfort. The four main classes of problem that must be managed during a hyperbaric evacuation are thermal balance, motion sickness, dealing with metabolic waste products, and severely cramped and confined conditions.

Bell to bell transfer may be used to rescue divers from a lost or entrapped bell. This will generally occur at or near the bottom, and the divers transfer between bells at ambient pressure. It is possible in some circumstances to use a bell as a rescue chamber to transport divers from one saturation system to another. This may require temporary modifications to the bell, and is only possible if the mating flanges of the systems are compatible.

Evacuation of a single diver who is medically stable, or a single diver with an attendant, may be possible using a hyperbaric stretcher or a small portable chamber if the duration of the trip is short, the pressure is suitable and the locking flanges are compatible.

Platforms

Most saturation diving is done offshore, in the vicinity of drilling and production platforms, or for salvage work, and requires precise positioning of the bell during the dive. In deep water this is usually done from a specialised diving support vessel, or a suitable vessel of opportunity on which a saturation system has been temporarily installed. Positioning can either be by a substantial anchor pattern, which may interfere with other anchoring spreads already established, and which presents its own set of hazards, or by dynamic positioning, which must be sufficiently reliable and fail-safe for the expected conditions.

Underwater habitats

Scientific saturation diving is usually conducted by researchers and technicians known as aquanauts living in an underwater habitat, a structure designed for people to live in for extended periods, where they can carry out almost all basic human functions: working, resting, eating, attending to personal hygiene, and sleeping, all while remaining under pressure beneath the surface.

Depth records
The diving depth record for offshore diving was achieved in 1988 by a team of professional divers (Th. Arnold, S. Icart, J.G. Marcel Auda, R. Peilho, P. Raude, L. Schneider) of the Comex S.A. industrial deep-sea diving company performing pipe line connection exercises at a depth of 534 meters of sea water (msw) (1752 fsw) in the Mediterranean Sea during a record scientific dive.

In the real working conditions of the offshore oil industry, in Campos Basin, Brazil, Brazilian saturation divers from the DSV Stena Marianos (later Mermaid Commander (2006)) performed a manifold installation for Petrobras at  depth in February 1990. When a lift bag attachment failed, the equipment was carried by the bottom currents to  depth, and the Brazilian diver Adelson D'Araujo Santos Jr. made the recovery and installation.

In 1992, Greek diver Theodoros Mavrostomos achieved a  simulated  of seawater depth in an on shore hyperbaric chamber. He took 43 days to complete the record experimental dive, where a hydrogen–helium–oxygen gas mixture was used as breathing gas.

The complexity, medical problems and accompanying high costs of professional diving to such extreme depths and the development of deep water atmospheric diving suits and ROVs in offshore oilfield drilling and production have effectively eliminated the need for ambient pressure manned intervention at extreme depths.

Training and registration

Training of saturation divers generally takes place at commercial diving schools registered to train saturation divers, and having the required infrastructure and equipment.
Diver training standards for saturation divers are published by a small number of organisations, and there is some international recognition of equivalence. The prerequisites for starting training are generally that the diver is already qualified as a bell diver and has a specified number of dives and hours of experience since qualifying.

Training of saturation divers generally starts with a competent and at least moderately experienced surface oriented bell diver and concentrates on the additional knowledge and skills required for saturation diving. There is a large additional technical component related to the specialised equipment.
For the South African Department of Labour Class I Diver, the additional knowledge and skills include:
A basic knowledge of the history of mixed gas and saturation diving,
An understanding of modular and diving support vessel based saturation diving systems, saturation life-support systems including environmental control, diver heating systems, sump drains and hyperbaric toilet discharges
An understanding and practical operating skills for closed diving bells, their standard and emergency equipment, handling systems, bell and excursion umbilicals and personal diving equipment, and their testing and maintenance requirements,
An understanding and practical operating skills for transfer under pressure and closed bell diving from 4-point moored and dynamically positioned vessels
An understanding of gas supplies and saturation consumables, including minimum gas requirements, gas transfer pumps, gas blending, and gas reclaim systems,
An understanding and practical experience in committing divers to saturation, and pressurisation
An understanding of split level saturation diving
Knowledge of the minimum personnel requirements for saturation diving operations and the responsibilities of the diving team members, including the superintendent, supervisor, life support supervisor, life support technician, support and systems technicians, gas man, and the bellman and diver, and experience and skills as diver and bellman
Knowledge of saturation decompression procedures, emergency saturation decompression and hyperbaric evacuation and practical experience of standard procedures and simulated emergency procedures.
Certification as a level 2 first aider, with additional knowledge of saturation hygiene, saturation first aid requirements and the deep diving compression disorders, high pressure nervous syndrome and compression arthralgia.

Safety and risk

The purpose of saturation diving is to extend the useful working time for dives without increasing the exposure to risk of decompression sickness. There is a trade-off against other risks associated with living under high-pressure saturation conditions, and the financial cost is high due to the complex infrastructure and expensive equipment and consumables required. The risk of decompression sickness is reduced at the cost of increased risk due to being committed to the saturation environment for the duration of the decompression schedule associated with the storage depth. Hyperbaric evacuation from saturation is possible, but not universally available, and is logistically complicated. Having an evacuation system on standby is expensive.

Some notable saturation diving incidents include:

In arts and media

For saturation diving in fiction, see Pressure (2015), The Abyss (1989), Sphere (1987), Goliath Awaits (1981), Dykket (The Dive) (1989), Pioneer (Pionér) (2013) and The Neptune Factor (1973).

In 2019, Netflix released Last Breath, a documentary which tells the story of Chris Lemons, a saturation diver who survived 30 minutes without a surface-supplied breathing gas supply after the vessel's dynamic positioning system failed during a storm, setting off a red alert. The two working divers started returning to the bell, but the ship drifted from the work site, dragging the bell with it, and his umbilical was snagged and severed under the load. He was able to return to the workplace using his bailout set, so was easily found by an ROV from the ship, but his bailout gas was insufficient for the time it took to get the ship back on position for a rescue attempt from the bell. Although presumed dead by support crew aboard the vessel, he was recovered by the second diver and successfully resuscitated in the bell. It has been hypothesised that his survival may have been a result of hypothermia, high partial pressure of oxygen in the bailout gas, or a combination. The ROV video footage shows him twitching while unconscious, which is consistent with an oxygen toxicity blackout.

See also

References

Further reading
 Subsea Manned Engineering by Gerhard Haux, Carson, California U.S.A., Best Publishing Company, 1982,

External links

Saturation Diving on www.divingheritage.com

Professional diving
Surface supplied diving procedures
Diving decompression